Whispers is a 2020 Saudi Arabian mystery thriller television series written and directed by Hana Alomair and starring Elham Ali, Mysoon Alruwaily and Norah Al Anbar.

Cast 
 Elham Ali as Lama
 Mysoon Alruwaily as Arwa
 Norah Al Anbar as Sawsan
 Leila Arabi as Samar
 Shaimaa Al Fadl as Amal
 Ali Al Sharif as Khaled
 Nada Tawhid as Wa'ad
 Mohammad Ali as Omar
 Osama Alqess as Ibrahim

Release 
Whispers was released on June 11, 2020.

References

External links
 
 

Saudi Arabian television series
2020 television series debuts